James Bradshaw (1613–1685) was an English clergyman and ejected minister.

James Bradshaw was born at Darcy Lever, near Bolton, Lancashire, and educated at Brasenose College, Oxford. He was presbyterian rector of Wigan, who in 1644 encouraged the siege of Lathom House by sermons from Jeremiah xv. 14, in which he compared Lathom's seven towers to the seven heads of the beast. He was superseded at Wigan by Charles Hotham for not observing the parliamentary fast, but called to Macclesfield, whence he was ejected in 1662. He preached at Houghton Chapel, and subsequently at Bradshaw Chapel, reading some of the prayers, but not subscribing. He died in 1685, aged 73, and was buried at Bolton on 26 February. He was succeeded by his eldest son, John Bradshaw.

References

1613 births
1685 deaths
Ejected English ministers of 1662